Mikkel E. G. Nielsen is a Danish film editor. In 2021 he won the Academy Award for Best Film Editing for his work on the film Sound of Metal, becoming the first Danish film editor to win that honor.

Selected filmography 
 A Royal Affair (2012) 
 Madame Bovary (2014)
 The Outsider (2018)
 Sound of Metal (2020; won Oscar for Best Film Editing)
 The Banshees of Inisherin (2022; nominated Oscar for Best Film Editing)

References

External links 
 

Living people
Place of birth missing (living people)
Year of birth missing (living people)
Danish emigrants to the United States
Danish film editors
Best Film Editing Academy Award winners
Best Editing BAFTA Award winners